The National Cactus and Succulent Botanical Garden and Research Centre, known as the Cactus Garden, is a  7 acres (2.8 ha) cactus garden in Sector 5 of Panchkula, Haryana, India , was established in 1987, and is known for its rare and endangered species of Indian succulent plants.

Collection 
The garden was opened in 2004 with 500 plants from the collection of Tarsem Lal, and founded by J S Sarkaria, whose son later lamented the lack of expert care the plants were receiving.

It has more than 3,500 species of cactus, many of them endangered, including Opuntias (prickly pears and chollas), Ferocactus (barrels), other succulents include Agaves, columnar cacti, Echinocereus (hedgehogs), and Mammillarias (pincushions) and is the largest of its kind in Asia.

Gallery

References

Panchkula
Cactus gardens
Tourist attractions in Panchkula district